Monica is a 2011 Bollywood movie with Divya Dutta, Ashutosh Rana and Rajit Kapur in the lead roles and produced by ghazal singer Anup Jalota and Kush Bhargava. It is directed by Sushen Bhatnagar and is inspired from real life incidents such as the Shivani Bhatnagar murder case and the 2G spectrum case.

Plot
The film traces the story of Monica Jaitley (Divya Dutta), who is an ambitious woman who wants to rise to the top at any cost. She has had a tormented life as a child as she was sexually abused in her childhood. Leaving her horrid past behind, she falls in love with journalist Raj Jaitley (Rajit Kapoor). They do get married; however they have an unhappy married life. She becomes a journalist herself and this creates a rift between them. The story traces her rise to the top and the compromises she ends up making and its impact on her personal life.

Cast

 Divya Dutta ... Monica Jaitley (Journalist)
 Rajit Kapur ... Raj Jaitley (Monica's husband)
 Ashutosh Rana ... Chandrakant Pandit (Politician)
 Kitu Gidwani ... Pamela Grewal (Industrialist)
 Yashpal Sharma ... Public Prosecutor Mathur 
 Tinnu Anand ... Assem Ray
 Kunika ... Judge
 Yatin Karyekar ... M.J.
 Mithilesh Chaturvedi ... Defence Lawyer
 Saurabh Dubey ... Shrikant Vohra
 Dadhey Pandey ... Sandeep Mishra (Broker)
 Anil Rastogi ... Monica's Father  
 Veda Rakesh ... Monica's Mother  
 Padam Singh ... Gopinath Pandey  
 Zarine Viccajee ... House Owner - Nainita

Soundtrack

Reception
Mahesh Bhatt tweeted, "Monica is a brave film, and Divya Dutta bears her soul on the screen like Shabana Azmi once did in the movie Arth".

Koimoi.com gave it a half star and a very unflattering review - "On the whole, Monica is a dull show and will not be able to prove itself at the ticket windows. Resounding flop!" 

Glamsham.com gave it 1.5/5 and their final take on the movie was "The hotchpotch film is a disappointment. MONICA, no my darling!" 

Indian Express review - "Monica has the intention, and a couple of effective performances, but doesn't keep up with its execution." 

Hindustan Times - Mayank Shekhar gave it 1/5 stars 

The Times of India gave it 3/5 stars and a decent review - "Don't be mislead by the title and don't be foxed by the low key publicity. This one's truly a surprise. Check it out."

References

External links
 

2011 films
2010s Hindi-language films
2G spectrum case
Films about corruption in India